Days of Wrath may refer to:
 Days of Wrath (2008 film), an American drama film
 Days of Wrath (2013 film), a South Korean film